Adept is a Swedish metalcore band from Trosa. Formed in 2004, the band consists of vocalist Robert Ljung, guitarists Gustav Lithammer and Kasper Larcombe-Tronstad, bassist Filip Brandelius, drummer Gabriel Hellmark. Adept have released three EPs and four studio albums to date, including Another Year of Disaster in 2009, Death Dealers (which saw a shift in sound from their original post-hardcore influences) in 2011, Silence the World in 2013, and their latest release Sleepless in 2016. They are currently  signed to Napalm Records.

History

Formation and EP's
Adept was founded in 2004 and in their first year, they self-released their first demo, Hopeless Illusions. This was followed a year later by their first EP, When the Sun Gave Up the Sky, also self-released, and again in 2006 by another EP, The Rose Will Decay. The band soon gained prominence and was signed by the Panic & Action label. Gustav Lithammer and Filip Brandelius both left their other post-hardcore band (Saving Joshua) to join Adept in 2010 and 2012 respectively.

Panic & Action and studio albums
On 4 February 2009, Adept released their first full-length album, Another Year of Disaster. In 2010, Adept toured in Germany with the band Her Bright Skies (also signed to Panic & Action), playing six venues: Hamburg, Berlin, Osnabrück, Munich, Stuttgart and Cologne.<ref>ADEPT: Tourstart heute in Hamburg: Her Bright Skies als Support  News at in-your-face.de of 22 January 2010 (German)</ref> In August 2010, Adept began working on a follow-up to Another Year of Disaster. They worked with Fredrik Nordström, a music producer who had previously worked with well-known acts such as In Flames, Bring Me the Horizon and At the Gates. On 11 March 2011, they released their second album, Death Dealers, which saw their sound shifting from post-hardcore towards metalcore. They toured Europe for the first time that same year, starting in Sweden and moving on through France, Russia, Finland, Norway, Finland, the Czech Republic, Denmark, Hungary and Italy. In May they played some shows in Germany as part of their tour, supporting As Blood Runs Black, Caliban and For Today, and also planned to play some shows in Austria and appeared as an opening act for August Burns Red. Adept released their third and latest album, Silence the World in late 2013, and supported it by once again setting out on a European tour.

On 14 November 2014 Adept announced via their Facebook page that their next album Sleepless will be released in 2015 while also confirming their appearance at that year's Impericon Festival, which toured Europe in April and May. However, they were forced to re-record the whole album due to contractual issues and ultimately ended up signing a new deal with Napalm Records in November 2015. Sleepless'' was finally released on February 19, 2016.

In October 2016, after playing various shows across Asia, the band announced the departure of guitarist Jerry and drummer Gabriel. The gaps in the band were filled by Kasper Larcombe-Tronstad on guitar and Mikael Norén, who is also playing for Walking With Strangers, on drums. Hellmark re-joined the band two years later.

Discography
Studio albums

EPs

Music videos
 "At Least Give Me My Dreams Back, You Negligent Whore!"
 "Sound the Alarm"
 "Shark! Shark! Shark!"
 "The Ivory Tower"
 "Secrets"
 "The Toughest Kids"
 "Dark Clouds"
 "Carry the Weight"

References

Swedish metalcore musical groups
Post-hardcore groups
2004 establishments in Sweden
Musical groups established in 2004
Musical quintets